Let's Get Inventin' is a New Zealand reality television series that takes young inventors (aged 8 – 17) and helps them to create inventions.  If successful they go into a prize pool, as well as having a chance to have their idea patented. In 2007, the series won the Qantas Award for best children's/youth programme. It has screened in over 72 countries. In 2014 the series was nominated for an International Emmy.

In Let's Get Inventin''' over seven seasons 91 Kiwi kids with ideas have been teamed up with some of the greatest inventors in the country to bring their inventions to life.  Rocket-powered ice skates, a six legged walking car and a jet-powered hover skateboard are some of the inventions with twelve having secured official patents. At the end of the series, the New Zealand public chooses their favorite invention for a prize package totalling $10,000; a trip to the UK; and a ride in the Aquada.

The BBC produced two versions of the New Zealand format: Whizz Whizz Bang Bang (2007) and Ed and Oucho's Excellent Inventions'' (2009 - 2010), which ran for two seasons.

Personalities
Chris Knox
King Kapisi
Jonah Lomu
David Tua
Jason Gunn
Sir Richard Hadlee
Alan Gibbs
Helen Clark
John Key
Mark Tilden
Wallace & Gromit

Season 1 Inventions
 Adam Gaston - Rocket Skates
 Sarah Trass - Buoyzone
 Rory Shillington - V8 Coffee
 Kristen Thomsen - Dogwalker
 Jason Wordsworth - Watergate
 John Shen - fresh Feet
 Kharn Gedge - Snow Scooter
 Jessie Lineham - Silent Hairdryer
 Sam Sinclair - Lacer Clips
 Isabella Coventry - Chord Companion
 Robert Wilson - Anti-Nervous Glasses
 Alex Drinkwater - Walking Cell-Phone Charger
 Ben Attwood - Super Bowl
 Natalie Crimp - UV Sensor
 Josh Murphy - Very Lazy Boy
 William Francis - Pogobike
 Emily Cooper - Downpipe Generator
 Ben Currie - Bush Balloon
 Mathew Selles - Hover board
 Krystal Cook - Woodcutting Machine
 Kyle White - Fish Tank Belt
 Ethan Hunter - Mossbot
 Justin Port and Brendan Port - Quad
 Brittany Smith-Frank - Magic Gadget

Season 2 Episodes
 Episode 1- ‘The Teenager' Morning-O-Matic Get out of Bed Machine
 Episode 2 - Trajectory Gold
 Episode 3 - Acoustic Apparel
 Episode 4 - Trampoline Powered ‘Gyminator'.
 Episode 5 - The Super Poopa Sucker
 Episode 6 - Suitcase Car
 Episode 7 - The Can Man
 Episode 8 - The Choo Coob
 Episode 9 - The Flying Pack
 Episode 10 - Paper Blocks
 Episode 11- Bouncy Suit
 Episode 12 - Gravity Rollerskates
 Episode 13 - Hover Car
 Episode 14 - Electronic Money Bank 
 Episode 15 - The Final Showdown - 'Inventor's Den'

Season 7 Winner  
 Scott Faville - ConeOrdinator

Awards
2014 - 42nd International Emmy® Award Nomination

2013 – Finalist - Cynopsis Kids Imagination Awards New York

2012 – WINNER -Qantas Best Children’s/Youth  TV Award

2009 – Finalist - Qantas Best Children’s/Youth  TV Award

2008 – Finalist - Qantas Best Children’s/Youth  TV Award

2007 – WINNER - Qantas Best Children’s/Youth  TV Award

2007 -  Finalist - Best Children's Programme  Air New Zealand Screen Awards

2006 – WINNER - Qantas Best Children’s/Youth  TV Award

References

New Zealand reality television series
Television shows funded by NZ on Air
TVNZ 2 original programming